Carson Airport  (Carson City Airport) is three miles northeast of Carson City, the capital of Nevada, United States. It is operated by the Carson City Airport Authority. The FAA's National Plan of Integrated Airport Systems for 2009–2013 categorized it as a reliever airport.

Many U.S. airports use the same three-letter location identifier for the FAA and IATA, but this airport is CXP to the FAA and CSN to the IATA (which assigned CXP to Tunggul Wulung Airport in Java, Indonesia).

Facilities
 
Its runway (9/27) is 5,906 by 75 feet (1,800 x 23 m).

In the year ending June 30, 2009 the airport had 83,500 aircraft operations, average 228 per day: 91% general aviation and 9% air taxi. 223 aircraft were then based at this airport: 76% single-engine, 11% multi-engine, 3% jet, <1% helicopter, 1% glider and 9% ultralight.
Based aircraft include several amphibians that fly to and land on nearby Lake Tahoe.

Historical airline service 

In 1985, SkyWest Airlines was operating nonstop service to Las Vegas (LAS) twice a day with Fairchild Swearingen Metroliner commuter propjets.

References

External links 
 Aerial photo as of September 1999 from USGS The National Map
 
 

Airports in Nevada
Buildings and structures in Carson City, Nevada
Transportation in Carson City, Nevada